The Hungarian Mixed Doubles Curling Championship is the national championship of mixed doubles curling in Hungary. It has been held annually since 2007.

List of champions and medallists

References

See also
Hungarian Men's Curling Championship
Hungarian Women's Curling Championship
Hungarian Mixed Curling Championship

Curling competitions in Hungary
Curling
Recurring sporting events established in 2007
2007 establishments in Hungary
National curling championships
Mixed doubles curling